José Luis López Monroy (born 19 October 1979 in Mexico City) is a Mexican former professional footballer who played as a midfielder.

Career
He played for Club Necaxa, in Aguascalientes, Mexico, as a midfielder (usually on the right flank). He joined the Pumas youth system when he was 13 years old and worked his way through the ranks before moving to Puebla F.C. and making his Primera Division de Mexico debut for them. After a brief period with La Franja he returned to Pumas and made his first appearance for them on 6 January 2001 against Estudiantes Tecos.

Lopez has also played for Club Irapuato in the Primera A.

Honours
UNAM
Mexican Primera División: Clausura 2004, Apertura 2004

Irapuato
Liga de Ascenso: Clausura 2011

References

External links

1979 births
Living people
Liga MX players
Club Puebla players
Club Universidad Nacional footballers
Club Necaxa footballers
Cruz Azul footballers
Correcaminos UAT footballers
Irapuato F.C. footballers
C.D. Veracruz footballers
C.F. Mérida footballers
Footballers from Mexico City
Mexican footballers
Association football midfielders